career,three

Brody McKnight (born October 20, 1989) is a Canadian athlete He is a free agent.

College career

McKnight played college football for the Montana Grizzlies where there as team captain he shared the team most valuable player award in 2010 with Chase Reynolds and in 2011 with Caleb McSurdy. In his senior year he was named team captain. He was arguably the best rugby punter in Montana history and within the nation in 2011. His rollout style continually pinned teams. His career long punt is 75 yards, his career long field goal is 54 yards. He had three game-winning field goals in pressure situations, one coming from 32 yards out to clinch the Big Sky Championship vs. Idaho State with his team down by two points with a few seconds left on the clock. He is arguably the most winningest kicker/punter in Montana history, playing in two national championships and making a semi-final appearance his senior year in a playoff run. McKnight has played in five championships in his career, three provincial high school championships and two national championships, losing all five. He has won three Big Sky Championship rings with the University of Montana and one Motor City Bowl ring with the University of Purdue.  He holds the school record for the most field goals in a game, with six. He was 8 for 8 on his Montana Pro Day completing kicks from 40, 45, 50, 55, and 60 yards. He punted for 45.3 yards while successfully completing 24 repetitions of 225 lbs on the bench press. He is ranked #11 as a kicker for the NFL 2012 draft.

McKnight is 3rd of all time FCS career leading scorer for kickers behind Chris Snyder and Dan Carpenter of Montana.

Career Points
(Kickers)
Player, Team
Dan Carpenter, Montana Chris Snyder, Montana Brody McKnight, Montana Marty Zendejas, Nevada Craig Coffin, Southern Ill.
Andrew Howard, Richmond Jason Cunningham, Montana St. Adam Keller, North Dakota St. Jordan Wiggs, SFA
Greg Kuehn, William & Mary
Miguel Antonio, Sam Houston St. William Will, Dayton
Brian Mitchell, Marshall/UNI
Scott Shields, Weber St.
Justin Syrovatka, South Dakota St.
Years
1985-88 2012-15 2005-08
Years PAT
2004-07 182 2000-03 182 2008-11 210 1984-87 169 2002-06 229
2006-09 195 2008-11 152 2011-14 198 2011-14 180 2002-05 166
Extra Pts.
TD Scored Pts.
60 2 362 60 2 362 59 4 358
PAT FG
Att. FG Att. Pts.
188 *75 103 *+413 187 70 *105 %394 220 59 87 387 175 72 90 385 239 50 63 379

http://fs.ncaa.org/Docs/stats/football_records/2017/FCS.pdf

Professional career
McKnight attended mini-camp with the New-York Jets and Arizona Cardinals. He successfully converted 12 of 15 field goals with a long of 53 yards in New York while completing 11 of 12 field goals with a long of 51 in Arizona. He was drafted eighth overall by the Montreal Alouettes in the 2011 CFL Draft and signed with them on July 8, 2012 after completing his college eligibility. He was later traded to the Eskimos a placekicker, a first and a fourth round pick in the 2013 CFL Draft on September 12, 2012. In the following off-season, he was again traded on March 1, 2013, this time to the Saskatchewan Roughriders along with a sixth round draft pick for two fifth round picks in the 2013 draft. Following his play in two pre-season games where he made two of three field goal attempts and punted six times for an average of 44.7 yards, McKnight was part of the team's final cuts on June 22, 2013. He was later signed by the Hamilton Tiger-Cats on July 3, 2013. On August 27, 2013, McKnight was signed by the Winnipeg Blue Bombers. He returned to the University of Montana in 2014 to complete his B.A. in sociology and criminology. McKnight currently resides in Kitsilano, British Columbia. He completed his degree and returned to Mosaic stadium in August for a tryout with the Saskatchewan Roughriders where he completed 12 of 14 field goals with a long of 60 yards while kicking off for a 68 yard average and a long of 74. McKnight battled into the wind for a 40 yard average punting the ball. He continues to kick as a free agent in the Top Flight Football League part of his 6th runner up in 2022 with Football Championships(3 higshchool,two National NCAA Championships,1 TFFL Championship runner-up) with the Vancouver Villains of the Top Flight Football League. Is currently an amateur golfer in Canada with aspirations to play in the professional ranks.

Brody McKnight has 7 championships under his belt;1 Motor City Bowl victory with the University of Purdue,3 Big Sky NCAA Championships with the University of Montana men's football team,1 British Columbia title in Rugby Union Premiere reserve with the Jericho Ravens,1 British Columbia title in Australian football with the Vancouver Cougars of the British Columbia Australian Football League.As well as a 1 British Columbia title coaching high school football with the New Westminster Hyacks.

References

External links
Just Sports Stats
Hamilton Tiger-Cats player bio

1989 births
Living people
Canadian football placekickers
Edmonton Elks players
Hamilton Tiger-Cats players
Montana Grizzlies football players
Montreal Alouettes players
Saskatchewan Roughriders players
Canadian football people from Vancouver